New College is one of the constituent colleges of the University of Oxford in the United Kingdom. Founded in 1379 by William of Wykeham in conjunction with Winchester College as its feeder school, New College is one of the oldest colleges at the university and was the first to admit undergraduate students.

New College also has a reputation for the exceptional academic performance of its students. In 2020, the college ranked first in the Norrington Table, a table assessing the relative performance of Oxford's undergraduates in final examinations. It has the 2nd-highest average Norrington Table ranking over the previous decade. The college is located in the centre of Oxford, between Holywell Street and New College Lane (known for Oxford's Bridge of Sighs). The college's sister college is King's College, Cambridge.

The college choir is one of the leading choirs of the world, and has recorded over one hundred albums; it has been awarded two Gramophone Awards.

History

Despite its name, New College is one of the oldest of the Oxford colleges; it was founded in 1379 by William of Wykeham, Bishop of Winchester, as "Saint Mary College of Winchester in Oxenford", the second college in Oxford to be dedicated to the Blessed Virgin Mary after Oriel College.

Foundation

In 1379 William of Wykeham had purchased land in Oxford and applied to King Richard II for a charter to allow the foundation of a college de novo. In his own charter of foundation, William of Wykeham declared the college to consist of a warden and seventy scholars. The site was acquired from several sources, including the City of Oxford, Merton College and Queen's College. This land had been the City Ditch, a haunt of thieves, and had been used for burials during the Black Death.

The college was founded in 1379 in conjunction with a feeder school, Winchester College (founded 1382, opened 1394). The two institutions have striking architectural similarities: both were the work of master mason William Wynford. On 5 March 1380, the first stone of New College was laid. By 14 April 1386, the college had taken formal possession of the buildings. William of Wykeham then drew up the statutes of the college. The coat of arms of the college is William of Wykeham's. It features two black chevrons, one said to have been added when he became a bishop and the other representing his skill with architecture (the chevron was a device used by masons). Winchester College uses the same arms. The college's motto, created by William of Wykeham, is "Manners Makyth Man".

Both Winchester College and New College were established for the education of priests, there being a shortage of properly educated clergy after the Black Death. William of Wykeham ordained that there were to be ten chaplains, three clerks and 16 choristers on the foundation of the college. The choristers were originally accommodated within the walls of the college, under one schoolmaster. Since then the school has expanded; in 1903 the choristers moved to New College School in Savile Road.

As well as being the first Oxford college for undergraduates, and the first to have senior members of the college give tutorials, New College was the first in Oxford to be deliberately designed around a main quadrangle. Students at New College were until 1834 exempt from taking the university's examinations for the BA and (in earlier times) the MA degrees, and were also ineligible for honours, though they still had to take the college's own tests. This contributed to the college's old reputation for "Golden scholars, silver bachelors, leaden masters and wooden doctors." More recently, like many of Oxford's colleges, New College admitted its first mixed-sex cohort in 1979, after six centuries as an institution for men only.

Civil war

In August 1651, New College was fortified by the Parliamentarian forces and the cloisters and Bell Tower were used for musketry training and munitions storage. In 1685, Monmouth's rebellion involved Robert Sewster, a fellow of the college, who commanded a company of university volunteers. These volunteers were mostly of New College and exercised in the Bowling Green.

College links

King Henry VI is said to have established his own new colleges, King's College, Cambridge, and Eton College, in admiration of William of Wykeham's twinned institutions of New College and Winchester College.

New College has an informal link with Winchester College, Eton College, and King's College, Cambridge, dating back to 1444, a four-way relationship known as the Amicabilis Concordia.

Buildings and gardens

At the time of its foundation, the college was a grand example of the "perpendicular style". and was larger than all of the (six) existing Oxford colleges combined.
 With the evolution of the college over the centuries, it has regularly added to its original quadrangle. The upper storey of the quad was added in the sixteenth century as attics which, in 1674, were replaced by a third storey proper as seen today. The oval turf at the centre of the quad is an eighteenth-century addition. 
Many of its buildings are listed as being of special architectural or historical importance and, today, the college is one of Oxford's most widely visited.

While the Mob Quad of Merton College is the earliest surviving medieval quadrangle in Oxford, New College was the first to be given a planned layout. The initial building phase saw the construction of the Great Quad with the Gate Tower, the dining hall with the four-storeyed Muniment Tower for access, the chapel, the cloisters (consecrated as a burial site in 1400) with the four-storeyed bell tower (1400), along with the Warden's Barn in New College Lane (1402) and the Long Room (behind the SE corner of the Great Quad), purpose-built as a garderobe.

The three-sided Garden Quadrangle, open at one end and begun by the addition of The Chequer to the east of the Great Quad in 1449, was completed in two stages between 1682-1707. Further college expansion led to the formation of Holywell Quad in the 19th century, with a range known as ‘New Buildings’ built along Holywell Street between 1872-96 in High Victorian style.

New College is currently building a new development on its Savile Road site, next to New College School. The Gradel Quadrangles were designed by David Kohn Architects and received planning permission in June 2018. They will provide an additional 99 student rooms, additional dining and kitchen space, a flexible learning hub and a performance venue.

Hall

The hall is the dining room of the college and its dimensions are eighty feet by forty feet (24 m × 12 m). In his charter, Wykeham forbade wrestling, dancing and all noisy games in the hall due to the close proximity of the college chapel, and prescribed the use of Latin in conversation. The linenfold panelling was added when Archbishop Warham was bursar of the college. The marble flooring replaced the original flooring in 1722. The open oak roof had been replaced by a ceiling at the end of the 18th century, and little is known of it. It was not until the Junior Common Room offered £1000 to restore the hall roof that work began on the roof seen today; this was in 1865 under the architect Sir George Gilbert Scott. The windows were replaced at the time with painted glass and the portraits moved to a higher level. The hall underwent a major restoration project and reopened in January 2015.

Chapel

The cloisters and the chapel, which follows the plan of Merton Chapel, retain their medieval appearance. Much of the medieval stained glass in the ante-chapel was restored in a 20-year project which was commended in the 2007 Oxford Preservation Trust Environmental Awards. Renowned for its grand interior, the chapel contains works by Sir Jacob Epstein and El Greco. Some of the stained glass windows, including the Great West Window, were designed by the 18th-century portraitist Sir Joshua Reynolds.

The choir stalls contain 62 14th-century misericords which are of outstanding beauty — several of New College's misericords were copied during the Victorian era, for use at Canterbury Cathedral. The niches of the reredos were provided by Sir Gilbert Scott and were fitted with statues in the late 19th century. Near the east end of the chapel is the Founder's Crosier, a relic overlaid with silver gilt and enamel that resembles a pastoral staff. This was exhibited at South Kensington in 1862.

The cloisters, containing a large holm oak tree, sit by the western wall of the Chapel, and were made famous by Harry Potter and the Goblet of Fire – featuring in a memorable scene in which Draco Malfoy is turned into a white ferret.The bell tower contains one of the oldest rings of ten bells. Michael Darbie recast the original five bells into eight in 1655, creating the first set of eight to be cast simultaneously. In 1712, two more bells were added, supposedly to outmatch Magdalen College's new ring of eight bells created in that year. The bells are rung by the Oxford Society of Change Ringers.

Gardens and city wall 

The Middle Gateway opens to the Garden Quadrangle, said to be modelled on the Palace of Versailles. The gardens include a mound that was first arranged in 1594 (with steps added in 1649, but now smooth with one set of stairs). In a 1761 edition of Pocket Companion for Oxford the mound is described:

 "In the middle of the Garden is a beautiful Mount with an easy ascent to the top of it, and the Walks around it, as well as the Summit of it, guarded with Yew Hedges. The Area before the Mount being divided into four Quarters, [..] the King's Arms, [..] opposite to it the Founder's; in the third a Sun Dial; and the Fourth, a Garden-Knot, all planted in Box, and neatly cut."

When William of Wykeham acquired the land on which to build the college, he agreed to maintain the city wall. Every three years the Lord Mayor and Corporation of the City of Oxford take a walk along the wall to make sure that the obligation is being fulfilled, a tradition dating back to the college's foundation in 1379. The largest herbaceous border in England runs alongside the medieval City Wall.

Treasures 

The college owns a large collection of silver (including the medieval silver gilt Founder's crosier, housed in a display case in the chapel),  the Oxford Chest, currently in the Ashmolean Museum, and two "unicorn horns" (narwhal tusks). According to A. J. Prickard (writing in 1909), the library once contained a copy of the first printed edition of Aristotle.

Choir 

As part of the original college statutes, William of Wykeham provided for a choral foundation of lay and academical clerks, with boy choristers to sing mass and the daily offices. It is a tradition that continues today with the choral services of evensong and Eucharist during term. The Choir has a reputation as one of the finest Anglican choirs in the world, and is known particularly for its performances of Renaissance and Baroque music. Some seventy recordings of the choir are still in the catalogue and as well as appearing a number of times at the BBC Proms, the choir make numerous concert tours.

In 1997, the choir won a Gramophone Award in the best-selling disc category for their album Agnus Dei, and in 2008, they won a Gramophone Award in the early music category for their recording of Nicholas Ludford's Missa Benedicta. Edward Higginbottom, organist and tutor in music at New College until 2014, became Oxford University's first choral professor. On Thursday 21 May 2009, for the first time in 400 years, the choir processed to Bartlemas Chapel for a ceremony and then on to the location of an ancient spring. On 29 June 2015 and 2016, at the invitation of the Holy See and the Cappella Musicale Pontificia Sistina, the choir sang at the Papal Pallium mass for the Solemnity of Saints Peter and Paul in St. Peter's Basilica.

Organ

The original organ was given by William Porte (1420–14233). An organ was removed in 1547 under Edward VI, and likewise in 1572. A Willis organ installed in 1874 contained parts from organs by Samuel Green in 1776, James Chapman Bishop, and Dallam in 1663.

The present instrument was constructed by Grant, Degens and Bradbeer in 1969. Tuning is regulated by Bishop and Son of London and Ipswich. In the summer of 2014 the organ was restored, with the key actions and other mechanisms being completely renewed by Goetze and Gwynn, and minor registration changes also made, including the 32 ft Fagot receiving a full-length bass (previously half-length).

Organists and directors of music

Student life

Middle Common Room

The Middle Common Room (MCR, the graduate member of the college) is very active. The common room itself and the MCR bar are in the Weston Buildings by the New College sports grounds and some of the graduate accommodation. Alongside a variety of social events, the MCR also holds graduate colloquia and produces its own journal (the New Collection) to share the wide range of research of its members.

Junior Common Room

The Junior Common Room (JCR) is the body of undergraduates at the college. It has a committee of elected and appointed members. Between the years 2017 and 2019, 45.2% of UK undergraduates admitted to New College were women and 19.3% identified themselves as BAME (Black, Asian, or Minority Ethnic).

Outreach 

New College has been running outreach initiatives for years, seeking to help and attract students from under-represented groups to apply to the University of Oxford. In 2017, it launched Step Up, a sustained contact outreach initiative which seeks to inspire students from partner schools in England and Wales to apply to Oxford and supports them to make a competitive application. In 2020, the college founded the Oxford for Wales consortium, Oxford Cymru, along with Jesus College and St Catherine’s College, offering support to students from state schools in Wales.

Rowing 

New College is one of only a few Oxford or Cambridge colleges to have won an Olympic medal; the New College Boat Club represented Great Britain at the Summer Olympics in Stockholm, Sweden, in 1912, and earned a silver medal. New College Boat Club is one of the few Oxford boat clubs to have held both headships at Summer Eights (though not in the same year), and one of only 11 Oxford or Cambridge colleges to have won the Grand Challenge Cup at Henley Royal Regatta, having also won the Visitor Challenge Cup twice, the Ladies Challenge Plate twice, and the Stewards' Challenge Cup twice.

People

Alumni and fellows 

New College has a legacy of notable individuals who have studied or worked at the college. The Simonyi Professorship of the Public Understanding of Science was held by Richard Dawkins and is now held by Marcus du Sautoy, both fellows of New College.

Wardens 

The warden is the college's principal, responsible for its academic leadership, chairing its governing body and representing the college internationally.

Notes

References

Sources 

 Buxton, John, and Penry Williams (1979). New College, Oxford, 1379–1979. Oxford: Warden and Fellows of New College. .
 Halford Smith, Alic (1952). New College, Oxford, and its Buildings. Oxford: Oxford University Press.
 Jenkinson, Matthew (2013). New College School, Oxford: A History. Oxford: Shire. .
 
 Tyerman, Christopher (2010). New College. London: Third Millennium. .

External links 

 New College JCR, Oxford
 New College MCR, Oxford
 College choir
 New College School

 
1379 establishments in England
Educational institutions established in the 14th century
Colleges of the University of Oxford
Grade I listed buildings in Oxford
Grade I listed educational buildings
Organisations based in Oxford with royal patronage
Buildings and structures of the University of Oxford